Adlumia is a genus of two species in the family Papaveraceae. The genus name derives from John Adlum (1759–1836), a surveyor, associate judge, plantsman and agriculturist who ran an 80 ha (200 acre) experimental farm in Georgetown, Washington, D.C. The genus was first described and published in Syst. Nat. Vol.2 on page 111 in 1821.

One species, Adlumia fungosa, is commonly known as the Allegheny vine, climbing fumitory, or mountain fringe. It is found in the eastern US, north of VA and TN, as far west as IA and MN, as well as in eastern Canada.

The other species, Adlumia asiatica, is native to Korea and immediately neighbouring parts of China (in Manchuria) and southeast Russia (within Amur and Khabarovsk).

References

External links
Connecticut Botanical Society: Adlumia fungosa

Fumarioideae
Papaveraceae genera
Plants described in 1821
Flora of Korea
Flora of Manchuria
Flora of Amur Oblast
Flora of Khabarovsk Krai
Flora of Canada